Choose Your Battles may refer to:

"Choose Your Battles", an episode of Teen Mom 2
"Choose Your Battles", an episode of The L.A. Complex 
Choose Your Battles, a 2011 EP by Jody Has A Hitlist  
"Choose Your Battles" (Katy Perry song), a song on the 2013 album Prism